Michael Damien Sweetney (born October 25, 1982) is an American former professional basketball player. He is now the assistant coach of the Yeshiva University Men's basketball team and head coach of the girls varsity basketball team at New York's Ramaz School.

High school and college careers
Sweetney went to Oxon Hill for high school, where he was named Washington Post All Met Basketball Player of the Year. He continued the tradition of highly skilled big men at Georgetown University, averaging 18.2 points while shooting nearly 55% over his three-year collegiate career. He was especially dominant over his junior year, in which he was named Honorable Mention All-America by AP, as well as being a Naismith College Player of the Year finalist and a candidate for the John R. Wooden Award.

That year, Sweetney was the only player in the nation to rank in the top 20 in scoring and rebounding. Despite playing only three seasons, he ranks seventh on Georgetown's career scoring list (1,750), fifth in rebounds (887) and sixth in blocks (180).

Professional career
Sweetney was selected by the New York Knicks with the 9th overall pick, in the 2003 NBA Draft. After a two-year stint with only 42 regular season contests in his rookie year, he was traded to the Chicago Bulls on October 4, 2005, alongside Tim Thomas and Jermaine Jackson, for Eddy Curry and Antonio Davis.

Sweetney has battled weight issues throughout his life and career. It was reported in The Chicago Tribune that, if Sweetney did not lose a certain amount of weight, his career could be in danger.

Sweetney's final NBA game ever ended up being in Game 2 of the 2007 Eastern Conference Semifinals on May 7th, 2007. In that game, the Bulls would lose 87 - 108 to the Detroit Pistons while Sweetney recorded 2 points in 3 minutes of playing time.

In the summer of 2009 he played with the Boston Celtics summer league team. He was invited to attend training camp in October 2009 to try out with the Celtics and attempt to resume an NBA career. He was waived on October 22. In early December 2011, Sweetney rejoined the Boston Celtics for training camp, but he was cut on December 22, 2011.

On January 13, 2012, Sweetney agreed to a deal with the Vaqueros de Bayamon of the BSN, Puerto Rico's basketball league. In February 2013, he signed a one-month deal with the Venezuelan team Guaiqueríes de Margarita. After his contract expired, he returned to the Vaqueros de Bayamon. In February 2014, he signed with Club Atlético Atenas.

On May 1, 2014, he signed with Brujos de Guayama. He was waived on July 1, 2014.

In November 2015, after more than a year off, Sweetney signed a contract in Uruguay with Urunday Universitario.

Sweetney competed for Team City of Gods in The Basketball Tournament. He was a center on the 2015 team who made it to the semifinals, losing to Overseas Elite 84-71. Sweetney has since run Tamir Goodman's basketball camp.

Coaching career
In 2019, Sweetney became an assistant coach for the Yeshiva University men's basketball team and head coach of the girls' varsity basketball team at Ramaz School.

References

External links
NBA.com profile
NBA.com Draft profile

1982 births
Living people
All-American college men's basketball players
American expatriate basketball people in China
American expatriate basketball people in the Dominican Republic
American expatriate basketball people in Uruguay
American expatriate basketball people in Venezuela
American men's basketball coaches
American men's basketball players
Baloncesto Superior Nacional players
Basketball coaches from Washington, D.C.
Basketball players from Washington, D.C.
Big3 players
Chicago Bulls players
Club Biguá de Villa Biarritz basketball players
Erie BayHawks (2008–2017) players
Georgetown Hoyas men's basketball players
Guaiqueríes de Margarita players
Guangzhou Loong Lions players
New York Knicks draft picks
New York Knicks players
Power forwards (basketball)
American men's 3x3 basketball players